Balsamocitrus is a genus of plant in family Rutaceae.

Species include:
 Balsamocitrus camerunensis

References 

 
Aurantioideae genera
Taxonomy articles created by Polbot